is a Japanese former. professional footballer who played as a midfielder. He played for Japan national team.

Club career
Ogasawara was born in Morioka on April 5, 1979. After graduating from high school, he joined J1 League club Kashima Antlers in 1998. He debuted in April 1998 and played many matches as offensive midfielder from 1999. In 2000, he became a regular midfielder and Antlers won the champions all three major title in Japan; J1 League, J.League Cup and Emperor's Cup first time in J1 League history. At Emperor's Cup Final, he scored two goals and contributed to won the champions. The club also won the champions 2001 J1 League for two years in a row. In Final at 2002 J.League Cup, he scored a winning goal and Antlers won the champions. He was also selected MVP award. He was also selected Best Eleven award in J1 League for five years in a row (2001-2005).

In August 2006, Ogasawara moved to Italy and signed with Serie A club Messina Peloro on loan. However he could not play many matches.

In July 2007, Ogasawara returned to Antlers. He played many matches as defensive midfielder and Antlers won the champions in J1 League for the first time in six years. Antlers also won the champions in 2007 Emperor's Cup. Antlers won the champions in J1 League for three years in a row (2007-2009). In 2009, he was selected MVP award. From 2010 season, Antlers won the champions 2010 Emperor's Cup, 2011, 2012 and 2015 J.League Cup. He was also MVP award in 2015 J.League Cup. In 2016, Antlers won the champions in J1 League and qualified for 2016 Club World Cup as host country champions. At Club World Cup, he played three matches and won the second place. Antlers also won the champions in 2016 Emperor's Cup. From 2017, his opportunity to play decreased. In 2018, Antlers won the champions in AFC Champions League first Asian title in the club history. He retired end of 2018 season.

International career
In April 1999, Ogasawara was selected Japan U-20 national team for 1999 World Youth Championship. At this tournament, he played all 7 matches as offensive midfielder and Japan won the 2nd place.

On March 21, 2002, Ogasawara debuted for Japan national team under manager Philippe Troussier against Ukraine. In June, he was selected Japan for 2002 World Cup. He played a match against Tunisia. Japan qualified to the knockout stage first time in Japan's history.

After 2002 World Cup, Ogasawara played many matches as starting member under manager Zico. He was selected Japan for 2003 Confederations Cup and 2004 Asian Cup. At 2004 Asian Cup, although he played only 2 matches, Japan won the champions. In 2005, he was selected Japan for 2005 Confederations Cup and played all 3 matches. In 2006, he was selected Japan for 2006 World Cup. Although he played 2 matches, Japan was eliminated in the group stages.

After 2006 World Cup, Ogasawara was not selected Japan for generational change. In February 2010, he was selected Japan by manager Takeshi Okada. He played for Japan for the first time in 4 years. He played 55 games and scored 7 goals for Japan until 2010.

Career statistics

Club

International

Scores and results list Japan's goal tally first, score column indicates score after each Ogasawara goal.

Honours
Kashima Antlers
 J1 League – 1998, 2000, 2001, 2007, 2008, 2009, 2016
 Emperor's Cup – 2000, 2007, 2010, 2016
 J.League Cup – 2000, 2002, 2011, 2012, 2015
 Japanese Super Cup – 1999, 2009, 2010, 2017
 A3 Champions Cup – 2003
 AFC Champions League - 2018

Japan
 FIFA World Youth Championship – 1999 (Runner-up)
 AFC Asian Cup – 2004

Individual
 J.League Most Valuable Player – 2009
 Japanese Footballer of the Year – 2009
 J.League Best Eleven – 2001, 2002, 2003, 2004, 2005, 2009
 J. League Cup MVP – 2002

References

External links
 
 

 Japan National Football Team Database
 
 Mitsuo Ogasawara at Kashima Antlers

1979 births
Living people
Association football people from Iwate Prefecture
Japanese footballers
Japan youth international footballers
Japan international footballers
J1 League players
Serie A players
Kashima Antlers players
A.C.R. Messina players
2002 FIFA World Cup players
2003 FIFA Confederations Cup players
2004 AFC Asian Cup players
2005 FIFA Confederations Cup players
2006 FIFA World Cup players
AFC Asian Cup-winning players
Japanese Footballer of the Year winners
J1 League Player of the Year winners
Japanese expatriate footballers
Expatriate footballers in Italy
Japanese expatriate sportspeople in Italy
Association football midfielders